Elma Ina Lewis (September 15, 1921 – January 1, 2004) was an American arts educator and the founder of the National Center of Afro-American Artists  and The Elma Lewis School of Fine Arts. She was one of the first recipients of a MacArthur Fellows Grant, in 1981, and received a Presidential Medal for the Arts by President Ronald Reagan in 1983. She is also an honorary member of Alpha Kappa Alpha sorority.

Early life and education

Lewis was born September 15, 1921, in Boston to parents Clairmont and Edwardine Lewis who had immigrated from Barbados. Lewis had two older brothers, Darnley and George from her mother's previous marriage. She attended the Ruggles Street Nursery School in 1924 where she was told her IQ was higher than it would be when she grew older. That memory stayed with her and would eventually prompt her to start her own school later on. Her parents were followers of Marcus Garvey to whose ideas she attributes her racial pride and desire to promote African culture. Lewis attended Roxbury Memorial High School for Girls where she studied voice, piano, and dance. She worked her way through college by acting in local theatre productions and graduated from Emerson College (B.L.I., 1943), and Boston University School of Education (M.Ed., 1944). After graduating from Boston University, Lewis taught speech therapy at Massachusetts Mental Health Center, the New England Hospital, and the Habit Clinic of Boston. She also taught dance and drama at the Cambridge Community Center and fine arts at the Harriet Tubman House. At age 23, Lewis and her parents moved from Dudley street in Roxbury to a house on Homestead street where she lived until her death. In 1951 Lewis's mother, Edwardine died. Her brother Darnley then moved into the downstairs section of the house with his wife and kids.

Arts education

The Elma Lewis School of Fine Arts (ELSFA)

In 1950 Lewis founded The Elma Lewis School of Fine Arts to provide arts education for the African-American community in Boston with a comprehensive program across the visual and performing arts. The teaching program at the school was focused on building character and multidisciplinary arts instruction through performance and exhibitions. Her school attracted many top professionals in the fine arts resulting in a very rigorous program. At its peak, the school enrolled 700 students and employed 100 teachers. Many of the school's graduates went on to a successful career in entertainment. Many attribute the notoriety of Lewis's school to the political culture of the time. Boston experienced a desegregation crisis in the mid 1970s after court-ordered desegregation of schools. Due to financial problems, enrollment in the school begin to dwindle. After years of battling financial crisis, and owing back taxes the school's site was foreclosed on in 1997.

National Center of Afro-American Artists (NCAAA)

Lewis founded the National Center of Afro-American Artists which served as an umbrella organization for the school, local arts groups, and a museum. The site which overlooked Franklin Park, was previously the Temple Mishkan Tefila and adjoining school. It was turned over to Lewis' organized by Jewish Philanthropists as part of the process of Jews leaving the city of Boston. Before acquiring this site, the school had passed through multiple locations which caused financial problems. By the 1980s, the center was in debt up to $720,000. The annual production of Langston Hughes’ Black Nativity became a staple of the organization and was directed every year by Lewis herself.

Technical Theatre Program
Lewis developed the Technical Theatre Program at the Massachusetts Correctional Institute. The 750 inmates at the Norfolk Prison who were enrolled in the program put on performances and learned skills such as musical composition. In 1972 the book “Who Took the Weight? Black Voices from Norfolk Prison,” describing their experiences, and including work by ten writer/artist inmates, was published with a foreword by Lewis.

Later life

Awards and affiliations

Lewis was elected a Fellow of the American Academy of Arts and Sciences in 1977. She was involved in promoting African American culture through art forms. She served as a board member for various organizations, including the American Academy of Arts and Sciences, Congressional Black Caucus, Metropolitan Cultural Alliance, and NAACP Lewis also received the Commonwealth Award, Massachusetts’ highest award in the arts, and myriad other honors including nearly thirty honorary doctorates from various universities. In October 2003, the National Visionary Leadership Project in ceremonies at Washington's J. F. Kennedy Center for the Performing Arts, named Miss Lewis, along with Ray Charles and John Hope Franklin, as a "Visionary Elder." She is commemorated on the Boston Women's Heritage Trail. In 1973, Lewis received a $350,000 grant from the Rockefeller foundation to update the school and pay the salaries of the school's staff. In 1981, Lewis was awarded the genius grant by the John D. and Catherine MacArthur Foundation. This grant was part of a five-year program where 21 MacArthur Prize Fellows would be awarded a yearly sum for their achievements in creativity. In 1983 she received the Presidential Medal for Arts from President Reagan. In 1986 Lewis received the Monarch Award from the National Council for Culture and Art. Each year the Council awarded two individuals for live achievements in the performing and visual arts.

Community Involvement

Lewis became known as the Grande Dame of Arts in Roxbury due to her school, achievements in performing arts, and her community involvement. Lewis often traveled around the world to speak at conferences and inform on the state of African-American culture as well as her experiences in running the NCAAA.

In 1980, Lewis was diagnosed with diabetes. She continued to spearhead cultural programs throughout Boston. She started the Elma Lewis Playhouse in Franklin Park during the summer months which boasted artists such as Duke Ellington and Arthur Fiedler. She further launched a clean-up campaign remove debris and drug paraphernalia from Franklin Park. The Elma Lewis Playhouse was renamed the Elma Lewis Theater at Franklin Park in 2003.

In September 1996, Roxbury hosted a salute to the “Grande Dame,” which was a three day birthday celebration of Lewis's achievements and life. It included events at many venues around the city and attracted prominent members of society including poet Maya Angelou and the UN Ambassador. Lewis was beginning to suffer from severe complications of diabetes. For her 76th birthday, she collected papers, photographs, musical notes, and other memorabilia to give to Northeastern University for a living archive.

Death

On January 1, 2004, Elma Lewis died at the age of 82 in her Boston home from pulmonary complications stemming from diabetes.

References

External links
The Elma Lewis papers are located in the Northeastern University Libraries, Archives and Special Collections Department, Boston, MA.
The Elma Lewis School of Fine Arts records, 1954-1992 are located in the Northeastern University Libraries, Archives and Special Collections Department, Boston, MA.
The National Center of Afro–American Artists records 1924–1998 are located in the Northeastern University Libraries, Archives and Special Collections Department, Boston, MA.
The Museum of the National Center of Afro-American Artists records, 1966-1998 are located in the Northeastern University Libraries, Archives and Special Collections Department, Boston, MA.
The John Ross papers, 1963-2006 are located in the Northeastern University Libraries, Archives and Special Collections Department, Boston, MA.

1921 births
2004 deaths
20th-century American educators
Boston University School of Education alumni
Emerson College alumni
Fellows of the American Academy of Arts and Sciences
MacArthur Fellows
People from Boston
United States National Medal of Arts recipients
Museum founders
20th-century American women educators
20th-century philanthropists
20th-century African-American educators
21st-century African-American people